The 1943 Alameda Coast Guard Sea Lions football team was an American football team that represented the United States Coast Guard's Alameda Coast Guard station during the 1943 college football season. The team compiled a 4–2–1 record. Lieutenant Joe Verducci was the coach, and George Arabian was the assistant coach. The team's two losses were against teams that ended the season ranked in the top 20 in the final AP Poll: Del Monte Pre-Flight (No. 8) and Amos Alonzo Stagg's Pacific Tigers (No. 19).

Two Alameda players were named by the Pacific coast sports editors to the 1943 Service All-Coast football team. Quentin Greenough received first-team honors, and Gonzalo Morales received second-team honors.

Schedule

Roster
The roster included:
 Dante Benedetti - guard
 Quentin Greenough - center, formerly of Oregon State
 Dale Halbert - halfback
 Colin Hill, formerly of San Jose State
 John Johnson - line
 Albert King - tackle, formerly of Loyola
 Rudy Matulka - guard
 Charles McDowell - end
 Bill McPartland - tackle, formerly of St. Mary's
 Donald Menicucci - halfback
 Gonzalo Morales - halfback, formerly of St. Mary's
 Billy Russo - fullback, formerly of San Francisco University
 Fred Shew - formerly of San Francisco University
 Howard Taft - end
 John Wilborn - halfback
 Charles Wilson - back

References

Alameda Coast Guard
Alameda Coast Guard Sea Lions football seasons
Alameda Coast Guard Sea Lions football